Macroglossum alcedo is a moth of the  family Sphingidae. It is known from Tanimbar, the Kai Islands, Aru, Papua New Guinea and Queensland.

Adults have brown patterned forewings and smaller yellow hindwings with a wide dark brown margin.

References

Macroglossum
Moths described in 1832